Robert W. Joles (born July 16, 1959) is an American voice actor. He is known for voicing many characters in many television shows, most notably the voice of Man Ray in SpongeBob SquarePants (replacing John Rhys-Davies), and Bill Green in Big City Greens. He also provided the voice of Bagheera in segments for the Jungle Cubs television series and The Jungle Book 2, and currently voices Grape Ape.

Filmography

Animation

Film

Video games 
 Armored Core V – Oswald Warwickshire, AC Pilot
 Champions of Norrath: Realms of EverQuest – Additional Voices
 Destroy All Humans! – Scientist #1 & G-Man #2
 Dirge of Cerberus: Final Fantasy VII – Grimoire Valentine
 Epic Mickey – Gremlin Gus
 EverQuest II – Modinite Z'Vol, Lieutenant llgar, Marshal Glorfel, Timothy Cooper, Olabumi Rashita, Koth Klorn, Generic Night Blood Warrior Enemy
 Fantastic Four – Blastaar
 Final Fantasy XV – Iedolas Aldercapt
 Final Fantasy 7 Remake – Additional Voices
 God of War II – Barbarian King, Icarus, Cronos, Hades
 Guild Wars – King Adelbern, Additional Voices
 Guild Wars 2 – Bohcht, Ijint, Nahautl, King Adelbern
 Guild Wars: Factions – Count zu Heltzer
 Heroes of Might and Magic V – Wulfstan, Demon Sovereign, Orc 3
 Infamous – Additional Voices
 Infamous Second Son – Additional Voices
 Jeanne d'Arc – Bishop
 Kingdom Hearts II – Additional Voices
 Kingdom Hearts Birth by Sleep – Sneezy
 Lego The Lord of the Rings – Various different characters in Middle Earth
 Lemony Snicket's A Series of Unfortunate Events – Uncle Monty
 Lightning Returns: Final Fantasy XIII – Additional Voices
 Metal Gear Solid 4: Guns of the Patriots –  Soldiers PMC Commander
 Middle-earth: Shadow of Mordor – Orcs
 Mighty No. 9 – Dr. Blackwell
 Murdered: Soul Suspect – Additional Voices
 Neopets: The Darkest Faerie – The Werelupe King
 Nicktoons MLB – Mr. Nesmith
  Party Pursuit  – Man Ray and Plankton's Cousin
 Shadows of the Damned – Demons
 Skylanders: Trap Team – Additional Voices
 SpongeBob SquarePants: Lights, Camera, Pants! – Man Ray
 SpongeBob's Truth or Square – Mr. Krabs
 SpongeBob's Boating Bash – Mr. Krabs
 SpongeBob Moves In! – Mr. Krabs and Man Ray
 Spider-Man 3 – Kingpin
 Stormrise – Scorpion Driver, Sentinel Soldier
 The Jungle Book Groove Party – Bagheera
 The Lego Movie Videogame – Additional Voices
 The Secret World – Henry Hawthorne
 The Sopranos: Road to Respect – Additional Voices
 The Wonderful 101 – Laambo, Walltha, Gimme
 Warhammer Online: Wrath of Heroes – Elgrim
 White Knight Chronicles: International Edition – King Vallos
 World of Final Fantasy – Odin
 World of Warcraft: Warlords of Draenor – Additional Voices
 World of Warcraft: Battle for Azeroth – Harbormaster Cyrus Crestfall

 Internet Sock Puppet Theatre – Jonas SockStarship – Recruitment Video NarratorA Very Potter Senior Year'' – Narrator

Theme parks 
 Indiana Jones Adventure: Temple of the Forbidden Eye – Sallah
 Disneyland Railroad – Narrator
 SpongeBob SquarePants 4D: The Great Jelly Rescue – Mr. Krabs

References

External links 
 

1959 births
Living people
American male video game actors
American male voice actors
American tubists
Audiobook narrators
Male actors from Los Angeles
20th-century American male actors
21st-century American male actors
21st-century tubists